The 2004 Team Ice Racing World Championship was the 26th edition of the Team World Championship. The final was held on ?, 2004, in Inzell, in Germany. Russia won their tenth title.

Final Classification

See also 
 2004 Individual Ice Speedway World Championship
 2004 Speedway World Cup in classic speedway
 2004 Speedway Grand Prix in classic speedway

References 

Ice speedway competitions
World